Madeleine Meilleur (born November 22, 1948) is a Canadian nurse, lawyer and former politician in Ontario, Canada. She was a Liberal member of the Legislative Assembly of Ontario from 2003 to 2016. She represented the riding of Ottawa—Vanier. She was a cabinet minister in the governments of Dalton McGuinty and Kathleen Wynne.

In May 2017, she was nominated by Prime Minister Justin Trudeau to become Canada's next Official Languages Commissioner. Her appointment had to be approved by the House of Commons and Senate to become official. On June 7, 2017, she withdrew her name from consideration due to controversy around her selection.

Background
Meilleur was born in the Quebec community of Kiamika. She is both a registered nurse and a lawyer, specializing in labour and employment law and has served on the Ottawa-Carleton Regional District Health Council, the Champlain District Health Council, the Ottawa-Carleton Children's Aid Society and the Vanier Housing Corporation.

Municipal politics
Meilleur was elected to the city of Vanier's municipal council in 1991, and also served as a council member in the Regional Municipality of Ottawa-Carleton (which included members from Vanier and other local municipalities). In 2000, she was acclaimed as a city councillor in the newly amalgamated city of Ottawa. During her time in municipal government, Meilleur represented the council on the French-Language Services Advisory Committee. She received the United Way's Community Builder's Award in 2001.

Provincial politics

McGuinty government
In the 2003 provincial election, Meilleur was elected in the riding of Ottawa—Vanier as the Liberal Party candidate.

The Liberal party won the election, and Meilleur was appointed Minister of Culture with responsibility for Francophone Affairs on October 23, 2003. In November 2003, Meilleur announced that provincial grants would be made available to libraries in rural communities. In April 2004, she announced the extension of demolition controls on heritage buildings. In 2008, she became the province's first cabinet minister ever to attend an international summit of La Francophonie.

On April 5, 2006, Meilleur was appointed Minister of Community and Social Services. She was reelected to her Ottawa—Vanier riding in the 2007 provincial election.

After she was re-elected in the 2011 provincial election, she was appointed Minister of Community Safety and Correctional Services.

Wynne government
When Kathleen Wynne took over as Premier in 2013, Meilleur continued in her position as Minister of Community Safety and Correctional Services. She was re-elected in the 2014 provincial election. On June 24, 2014 she was appointed Attorney General of Ontario, the first francophone to hold the position.

In 2016, she was criticized over her initial refusal and subsequent delay in releasing the Special Investigations Unit's report on the police shooting of Andrew Loku.

On June 9, 2016, Meilleur announced her retirement after 25 years in politics. Her resignation from the legislature coincided with a June 2016 cabinet shuffle.

Cabinet positions

Commissioner of Official Languages
Meilleur was nominated to become the Commissioner of Official Language by the federal government on May 15, 2017. Her appointment was challenged as failing to be sufficiently non-partisan due to Meilleur's links to the ruling Liberal Party of Canada. She withdrew her name from consideration on June 7, 2017. In the end, this position was filled by Raymond Théberge.

Electoral record

References

External links

1948 births
21st-century Canadian politicians
21st-century Canadian women politicians
Attorneys General of Ontario
Female justice ministers
Franco-Ontarian people
French Quebecers
Lawyers in Ontario
Living people
Members of the Executive Council of Ontario
Ontario Liberal Party MPPs
Ottawa city councillors
Ottawa-Carleton regional councillors
People from Laurentides
Women government ministers of Canada
Women municipal councillors in Canada
Women MPPs in Ontario
University of Ottawa Faculty of Law alumni